Frankville may refer to:

Frankville, Alabama
Frankville, Iowa
Frankville, Missouri
Frankville, Nova Scotia